Brejo Alegre is a municipality in the state of São Paulo in Brazil. The population is 2,889 (2020 est.) in an area of 106 km2.

References

Municipalities in São Paulo (state)